is a Japanese ski jumper who represents the Kobe Clinic Ski Team.

She placed seventh in the 2011 World Championship in Oslo.

References

External links

1984 births
Living people
Japanese female ski jumpers
20th-century Japanese women
21st-century Japanese women